Hod Moshonov, also known by his stage name BEMET, is an Israeli record producer. His primary genre can be characterized as electronic hip hop but includes influences of specific songs from EDM, electro pop, trap, bailefunk, reggaeton, drum and bass, jazz, and rock. His primary following is, in addition to Israel, Brazil and India. He is also a producer, composer, pianist and performer.

Biography
Hod Moshonov was born in Israel on June 8, 1989. He began playing the jazz piano at the age of 5. At the age of 13, Hod founded his first jazz band, the Hod Moshonov Trio. At the age of 14, he left on a worldwide tour with his band. He also participated in a special playlist on Israel television channel 22, which televised live from the "Milestone- Shuni" club. Later, in 2005, Hod received an invitation from the prestigious IAJE festival in New York City to perform his Jazz concert. Hod was awarded full scholarship for his studies in the Berklee College of Music. In 2011 The New York Times  published an article reviewing his performance in the Thelonious Monk Institute of Jazz competition in Washington DC to which he was invited by Herbie Hancock and Danilo Perez.

In 2014 Hod began working alongside the producer Bill Laswell (weather report Prince) on the production of the second record of the Yemen Blues band. BEMET then moved on to recording the most recent golden album of Assaf Avidan – "golden shadow". After he played the opening of Red Hot Chili Peppers in the extended version of the Israeli singer Riff Cohen, he decided to jump start his career and took on the stage name – "BEMET". In 2016, BEMET entered the Indian market, after producing a renewed version of "Mumbai Dance" for the Indian artist Nucleya. Afterwards, he initiated collaboration with MC Tommy (An Israeli- Brazilian singer, a DJ and performer). Over the past few years (2014–2017) BEMET has collaborated with the dubstep  artist – Borgore, was a supporter in the large scale Major Laser act in Israel, and collaborated with DJs Braindead, Ido B Zooki, and Israeli Rapper Subliminal. In 2013, BEMET was asked by the Roland Corporation to collaborate in improving an early Synthesizer of the company (Synthesizer AX) and converting its sounds to the sounds of a professional Roland synthesizers such as Juno 60, SH180 and the Nord stage. In 2016 he became a Loopmasters artist, and collaborated with the "Earth Moments Company" to produce his first bundle under his own brandname "BEMET oriental synths".

Over the years, BEMET performed in various festivals and events throughout Europe, the US, and Asia such as South by South West, KEXP radio , Paleo , Covelong point India and Drum & Bass festival in Dresden. BEMET's live performances are characterized by explosions of light and sound which have been compared to the energy of Prodigiy (rapper) combined with the intensity of Die Antword and the hipness of Mo and Major Laser. His first Mini Album under the "Inch Per Second" title was released in 2014 and was primarily in the Drum and bass underground style. However, this Mini Album was not widely sold.  The exception was one tune called "The Track" (Money on the spot) which received positive coverage by Mad Decent label (Diplo) who described it as the "Next Bass music from Tel Aviv".  BEMET's second album, called "The Chase after Tomorrow" was also released in 2014, and was highly emotive, with a great deal of Hip hop and Tempo. Some of the tracks in the album featured the electronic producer from Los Angeles – Free the Robots and the rapper "Rebel Sun". The album received critical response from critics and magazines throughout the world, including- the Brooklyn Radio, BBC radio & Poplock. Furthermore, the track Ubber Dance received the title "track of the month" from Nova Radio in Tokyo and was also performed in various Remix permutations.

Following the release of his first two albums in the year 2017, BEMET's following increased pursuant to his release of the four singles from his Brazilian project. Two of these singles were TudoBemet, and "Happy". These singles were widely shared and viewed on social media in Israel, Brazil, Portugal and India, receiving millions of views on YouTube. In October 2017 BEMET released his first video single- Sababa, which was directed at his Indian followers. The video was produced during BEMET's tour of India in the summer of 2017 and received positive reviews by the Indian Media, including The Times of India, Grapevine Magazine and UC News.

References 

Living people
1989 births
Musicians from Tel Aviv
Israeli record producers
Israeli Jews